Shaul Amor (21 December 1940 – 2 October 2004) was an Israeli politician who served as a Minister without Portfolio between January and July 1999.

Biography
Born in Boujad, Morocco in 1940, Amor made aliyah in 1956. He studied at the Social Work institute in Haifa, and served as mayor of Migdal HaEmek.

In 1988 he was elected to the Knesset on the Likud list. He was re-elected in 1992 and 1996, and on 20 January 1999 was made a Minister without Portfolio. However, he lost his seat in the May 1999 elections, after which he also lost his ministerial position.

Amor was appointed Israel's ambassador to Belgium, from 1999 until 2003, returning to Israel 18 months before his death.

References

External links
 

1940 births
2004 deaths
Government ministers of Israel
Jewish Israeli politicians
Likud politicians
Mayors of places in Israel
Members of the 12th Knesset (1988–1992)
Members of the 13th Knesset (1992–1996)
Members of the 14th Knesset (1996–1999)
Moroccan emigrants to Israel
20th-century Moroccan Jews
People from Boujad
Ambassadors of Israel to Belgium
Candidates for President of Israel